The 2001 Rio de Janeiro motorcycle Grand Prix was the sixteenth and latest round of the 2001 Grand Prix motorcycle racing season. It took place on the weekend of 1–3 November 2001 at the Autódromo Internacional Nelson Piquet. It was also the final 500cc race in Grand Prix motorcycle racing history. This also marked the final Grand Prix win in the career of Daijiro Kato before his death caused by a crash in the 2003 Japanese motorcycle Grand Prix race.

500 cc classification
The race was held in two parts as rain caused its interruption; aggregate times from the two heats determined the final result.

250 cc classification

125 cc classification

Championship standings after the race (500cc)
Below are the standings for the top five riders and constructors after round sixteen has concluded.

Riders' Championship standings

Constructors' Championship standings

 Note: Only the top five positions are included for both sets of standings.

References

Rio de Janeiro motorcycle Grand Prix
Rio de Janeiro
Rio de Janeiro Motorcycle Grand Prix